Yekkeh Soud or Yekkeh Seud may refer to:
 Yekkeh Soud-e Olya
 Yekkeh Soud-e Sofla